Ochsenheimeria bubalella is a moth of the  family Ypsolophidae. It is found in southern France and Spain.

The larvae feed on Juncus and Scirpus species. They bore the stem of their host plant.

References

Moths described in 1860
Ypsolophidae
Moths of Europe